Jean-François Roberge is a Canadian politician in Quebec, who was elected to the National Assembly of Quebec in the 2014 election. He represents the electoral district of Chambly as a member of the Coalition Avenir Québec and is the current Minister of Education.

He was also the party's candidate in Vachon in the 2012 election.

Prior to his election to the legislature, Roberge was an elementary school teacher, as well as a regular commentator on education issues for TVA's morning talk show Deux filles le matin. He published a young adult novel, Francis perdu dans les méandres, in 2010.

Minister of Education (2018–present)
Under Roberge's term as Minister of Education, The government show plans to replaced the Ethics and religious culture, with a new curriculum which would shift the focus from religion toward culture and citizenship.

Also as Minsister Roberge saw The CAQ government passing bill 40 which saw the French and English school boards being replaced with School service centres. The abolishing of school boards is said to save the government more than $10 million. Their reason for this is to try to improve the quality of education in Quebec.

The English school boards of Quebec invoked Article 23 of the Canadian Charter of Rights and Freedom, which is the official language minority education rights. They take legal action to get exempted from Bill 40.

In December 6, 2022: Minsister Roberge tabled a bill that would make the Oath of Allegiance to the King optional for MNAs. That bill passed on December 9, 2022.

Electoral record

|}

|}

References

Coalition Avenir Québec MNAs
Living people
French Quebecers
People from Montérégie
Canadian writers of young adult literature
Canadian novelists in French
Writers from Quebec
Canadian male novelists
21st-century Canadian novelists
21st-century Canadian politicians
21st-century Canadian male writers
Year of birth missing (living people)